The Ports Act 1991 is an Act of the Parliament of the United Kingdom  intended to enable the privatization of trust ports in the United Kingdom.

References

External links 
 The Ports Act 1991 on the legislation.gov.uk portal

United Kingdom Acts of Parliament 1991